Saleeite is a secondary uranium mineral occurring in the oxidized zones of uranium deposits, or as disseminations in carnotite-bearing sandstones. Its chemical formula is Mg(UO2)2(PO4)2·10(H2O). 

It was discovered in 1932 at Shinkolobwe, Katanga Province, Democratic Republic of the Congo, and is named for Belgian mineralogist Achille Salée (1883-1932), Professor at Université catholique de Louvain, Belgium. It was later determined that the Katanga mineral was meta-saleeite Mg(UO2)2(PO4)2·8(H2O) and the type locality was assigned to the Weißer Hirsch Mine, Neustädtel, Schneeberg District, Erzgebirge, Saxony, Germany.

References

Uranium(VI) minerals
Phosphate minerals